At this early point in the history of license plates in the United States of America, none of the 45 states, territories, or the District of Columbia, was issuing its own plates. In this year New York became the first state to require vehicle owners to register their vehicles. The owners of these early New York vehicles had to provide their own license plates with only their initials on them. Plates were often made of metal letters on a thick leather background or on a steel base. This system of using the owners initials lasted until 1903 when a change to using a number provided by the state began.

While New York may have been the first state to require license plates for their vehicles, there were already cities that required plates. The city of Chicago passed an ordinance in 1899 that required their owners to pass a health test, an oral test, demonstrate their capability to operate the type of vehicle they owned, such as gasoline, steam, or electric, and mandated that the owners place a registration number issued by the city on the back of their vehicle. While this Chicago ordinance took effect in 1899, the first tests were not held until February 17, 1900.

Passenger baseplates
In the table below, a light green background indicates that the owner of the vehicle was required to provide their own license plates. These plates are called "prestate" by most collectors. In the prestate era many states only provided the license plate number on a small disc or on paper, and the owner was required to have their license plate(s) made. These early license plates were created from kits that could be purchased at a hardware store, may have been available from automobile clubs or associations, they were forged by blacksmiths or other tradesmen, or the owner may have made their own plate with whatever materials they had on hand. Prestate plates were made from a variety of materials, but most often were made of leather, steel, or wood. The prestate era officially ended in 1918 when the state of Florida began to officially issue license plates.

State registrations
The following chart shows the year each U.S. state, territory, and the District of Columbia began to require license plates (prestate) and when they started to provide license plates. In some cases locations did not issue any prestate plates or no prestate plates are known, and this is indicated by the table cell not having a date. Clicking on a state name or a year in the table will take you to those articles.

See also
Antique vehicle registration
Electronic license plate
Motor vehicle registration
Vehicle license

References

External links

1901 in the United States
1901